The Black Theater of Ardmore is a historic theater building in Ardmore, Oklahoma, United States.  It was built in 1922 during a time of racial segregation, when Ardmore's community of more than 2,000 African American residents had its own business district and its own residential area.  The theater provided entertainment for black residents who were excluded from patronizing white theaters.  It is also a symbol to the once-thriving black business district of Ardmore.  It functioned as a theater until 1944, when it was sold to the Metropolitan African Methodist Episcopal Church.  The building is listed on the National Register of Historic Places.

References

African-American history of Oklahoma
African-American segregation in the United States
Buildings and structures in Carter County, Oklahoma
Theatres completed in 1922
Theatres on the National Register of Historic Places in Oklahoma
National Register of Historic Places in Carter County, Oklahoma
1922 establishments in Oklahoma